Yantra Cove is a 560 m wide cove in the south coast of the Burgas Peninsula of Livingston Island in the South Shetland Islands, Antarctica east of St. Evtimiy Crag, southeast of Asen Peak and south-southeast of Delchev Peak.  The feature was named after the Yantra River in northern Bulgaria.

Location
Bulgarian survey Tangra 2004/05 and mapping in 2005 and 2009).

Maps
 L.L. Ivanov et al. Antarctica: Livingston Island and Greenwich Island, South Shetland Islands. Scale 1:100000 topographic map. Sofia: Antarctic Place-names Commission of Bulgaria, 2005.
 L.L. Ivanov. Antarctica: Livingston Island and Greenwich, Robert, Snow and Smith Islands. Scale 1:120000 topographic map. Troyan: Manfred Wörner Foundation, 2010.  (First edition 2009. )
 Antarctic Digital Database (ADD). Scale 1:250000 topographic map of Antarctica. Scientific Committee on Antarctic Research (SCAR). Since 1993, regularly updated.
 L.L. Ivanov. Antarctica: Livingston Island and Smith Island. Scale 1:100000 topographic map. Manfred Wörner Foundation, 2017.

References
 Yantra Cove. SCAR Composite Antarctic Gazetteer
 Bulgarian Antarctic Gazetteer. Antarctic Place-names Commission. (details in Bulgarian, basic data in English)

External links
 Yantra Cove. Copernix satellite image

Coves of Livingston Island